Becker is a German surname.

Becker may also refer to:

Places

United States 
Becker, Florida

Becker, Minnesota
Becker, Mississippi

Becker, Texas
Becker County, Minnesota
Becker Township, Minnesota (disambiguation)

Antarctica 
Mount Becker, a prominent mountain 1 mile northeast of Mount Boyer, in the Merrick Mountains, Ellsworth Land

Businesses
A. G. Becker, former U.S. investment bank
Becker Entertainment, Australian entertainment company
Becker Film Group, Australian company founded in 2008
Becker Group, Australian independent film and television distribution company, 1965–2007
Becker's, Canadian convenience store chain
Château Marquis d'Alesme Becker, Bordeaux wine producer, archaically named simply Becker
Harman Becker Automotive Systems, known as Becker, manufacturer of car audio systems and part of Harman International Industries

Taxonomy

Becker, taken as a taxonomic authority, may refer to:
 Alexander K. Becker (1818–1901), German botanist and entomologist
 Johann Becker (entomologist) (1932–2004), Brazilian entomologist

Education
Becker College, Worcester and Leicester, Massachusetts
Carl Becker House, residential college at Cornell University, named after Carl L. Becker

Medicine
Becker's muscular dystrophy, named after Peter Emil Becker
Becker disease, a neuromuscular disease
Becker's nevus, skin disorder documented by Samuel William Becker

Fiction
Becker (TV series), a CBS sitcom that ran from 1998 to 2004
Captain Becker, character in the ITV sci-fi drama Primeval

Other
Becker Psalter (1602), German metrical psalter published by Cornelius Becker
Becker 20mm cannon, German automatic cannon developed for aircraft use during World War I
Nightfreak and the Sons of Becker (2004), rock album by The Coral
Pettkus v. Becker (1980), Canadian family law decision

See also
 Becquer (disambiguation)